The 2019 Nigerian House of Representatives elections in Adamawa State was held on February 23, 2019, to elect members of the House of Representatives to represent Adamawa State, Nigeria.

Overview

Summary

Results

Demsa/Numan/Lamurde 
A total of 13 candidates registered with the Independent National Electoral Commission to contest in the election. PDP candidate Kwamoti Bitrus Laori won the election, defeating APC Olvadi Bema Madayi and 11 other party candidates. Laori received 68.14% of the votes, while Madayi received 27.96%.

Fufore/Song 
A total of 10 candidates registered with the Independent National Electoral Commission to contest in the election. PDP candidate Mohammed M. Saidu won the election, defeating APC Sadiq Ibrahim and 8 other party candidates. Saidu received 42.6% of the votes, while Ibrahim received 39.82%.

Gombi/Hong 
A total of 13 candidates registered with the Independent National Electoral Commission to contest in the election. APC candidate Yusuf Yakub won the election, defeating PDP Pukuma James Tartus and 11 other party candidates. Yakub received 39.78% of the votes, while Tartus received 36.50%.

Guyuk/Shelleng 
A total of 8 candidates registered with the Independent National Electoral Commission to contest in the election. PDP candidate Gideon Goroki won the election, defeating APC Ahmaou Philip Gutuwa and 6 other party candidates. Goroki received 54.24% of the votes, while Philip received 34.83%.

Madagali/Michika 
A total of 14 candidates registered with the Independent National Electoral Commission to contest in the election. PDP candidate Zakaria Dauda Nyampa won the election, defeating APC Adamu Usman and 12 other party candidates. Dauda received 58.94% of the votes, while Usman received 28.23%.

Maiha/Mubi North/Mubi South 
A total of 7 candidates registered with the Independent National Electoral Commission to contest in the election. APC candidate Ja'Afar Abubakar Magaji won the election, defeating PDP Umar Babangida Maina and 5 other party candidates. Abubakar received 49.84% of the votes, while Babangida received 36.61%.

Mayo Belwa/Toungo/Jada/Ganye 
A total of 9 candidates registered with the Independent National Electoral Commission to contest in the election. APC candidate Abdulrazak Namdas won the election, defeating PDP Kabiru Muktar and 7 other party candidates. Namdas received 48.35% of the votes, while Muktar received 47.62%.

Yola North/Yola South/Girei  
A total of 12 candidates registered with the Independent National Electoral Commission to contest in the election. APC candidate Abdulrauf Abdulkadir Moddibo had most votes, followed by PDP Jafaru Suleiman Ribadu and 10 other party candidates. Moddibo received 49.66% of the votes, while Suleiman received 29.92%. Jafaru Suleiman Ribadu was declared winner after the Supreme Court nullified the election of Abdulkadir Moddibo. It was stated that Mr Modibbo did not qualify to be nominated as a candidate for the APC because he was yet to complete his National Youth Service Corps as he was still in his NYSC service year.

References 

Adamawa State House of Representatives elections
House of Representatives
Adamawa